Joseph Y. Resnick Airport , is located in Ellenville, New York, United States.

Facilities and aircraft
It is situated one mile northeast of the central business district, and contains one runway. The runway, 4/22, is of asphalt and measures .

The airport currently has "tie-down" spaces to rent and has aviation fuel available for purchase.

For the 12-month period ending May 15, 2014, the airport had approximately 6328 aircraft operations, an average of 113 per week: 85% local general aviation, 14% transient general aviation, and 2% air taxi. At that time there were 32 aircraft based at the airport: 31 single-engine and 1 multi-engine.

History
The airport was constructed in 1968. It is named after Joseph Yale Resnick, a U.S. House of Representatives member who served from January 3, 1965, until January 3, 1969. In 1988 the town of Wawarsing purchased the airport with the assistance of federal and state funding.  It is still currently operated by the town of Wawarsing

References

Airports in New York (state)
Transportation buildings and structures in Ulster County, New York